Mario Carpo is an architectural historian and critic, and is currently the inaugural Reyner Banham Professor of Architectural History and Theory at the Bartlett School of Architecture, University College London, and Professor of Architectural Theory at the Institute of Architecture of the University of Applied Arts Vienna.

References 

Living people
University of Florence alumni
Academic staff of the University of Geneva
Yale School of Architecture faculty
Academic staff of the University of Florence
Cornell University faculty
Massachusetts Institute of Technology faculty
Year of birth missing (living people)